Warriors FC sat out the 2020 Singapore Premier League season due to financial and legal troubles.

In November 2019, they were charged on court with 107 counts of not paying their staff salaries. In total, they failed to pay more than S$350,000 in salaries to about 30 employees, including players, sports trainers and support staff.

2 days after the incident being reported, ST reported that there were 2 parties that were interested to take over Warriors FC.

On 2 December 2019, the club's management committee said they had paid a total of S$150,000 in salaries to half of its football squad to settle arrears.

On 31 December 2019, FAS had instructed Warriors FC to sit out the 2020 Singapore Premier League season due to their financial issue and legal troubles.

Squad

S.League squad

U19 Squad

Coaching staff

Transfers

Pre-Season transfers

In

Note 1:  Illyas Lee moves to Tiong Bahru FC after the club was excluded from the 2020 Singapore Premier League season. 
Note 2:  Fazrul Nawaz moves to Tampines Rovers after the club was excluded from the 2020 Singapore Premier League season.

Out

Note 1: Fairoz Hassan moved to Tiong Bahru FC after being released from the club. He subsequently moved to Albirex Niigata (S) during the mid season transfer window

Extension / Retained

Promoted

Trial

Mid-Season Transfer

Out

Friendly

Pre-Season Friendly

Team statistics

Appearances and goals

Competitions

Overview

Singapore Premier League

Singapore Cup

See also 
 2015 Warriors FC season
 2016 Warriors FC season
 2017 Warriors FC season
 2018 Warriors FC season
 2019 Warriors FC season

References 

Warriors FC
Warriors FC seasons